The first-ever elections to Philippine Senate were held on October 3, 1916, immediately after the passage of the Philippine Autonomy Act, known as the Jones Law.  The Act created the Senate of the Philippines.  The Senate replaced the Philippine Commission as the upper house of the Philippine Legislature, thus creating for the first time a fully elected national legislative branch in the Philippines, under the American colonial Insular Government. Each district elected two senators (plurality-at-large): The first-placer was to serve a six-year term while the second-placer was to serve a three-year term. On each election thereafter, one seat per district was up (first past the post). The senators from the 12th district were appointed by the American governor-general for no fixed term.

Results

References

See also 

 4th Philippine Legislature

1916
1916 elections in the Philippines